Dark Shadows is a series of audio dramas continuing the story of the 1966–1971 television soap opera of the same name. There have been two productions of Dark Shadows audio dramas. The first production, released in 2004 by MPI Home Video, was based on a 2003 stage play. Since 2006, Big Finish Productions have produced a number of audio dramas.

MPI Home Video
Starring David Selby, Kathryn Leigh Scott, John Karlen, Nancy Barrett, Lara Parker, Roger Davis, Marie Wallace, Christopher Pennock, Donna Wandrey, James Storm, and Terry Crawford.

Big Finish Productions

Full Cast Dramas
The first season featured David Selby (Quentin Collins), Lara Parker (Angelique Bouchard Collins), Kathryn Leigh Scott (Maggie Evans), and John Karlen (Willie Loomis). The role of Barnabas Collins was recast with Andrew Collins. Robert Rodan, who played Adam in the original series, also appears in the first and fourth story, playing a new character. A second series was released in 2010. In addition to the cast returning from Series One, Kingdom of the Dead also featured Lysette Anthony, Alec Newman, Lizzie Hopley, Jerry Lacy, and David Warner. The third full cast drama Blood & Fire, released on June 27, 2016 to celebrate exactly 50 years since the start of the original TV series, featured Lara Parker (Angelique Bouchard), Joanna Going (Laura Murdoch Stockbridge), Nancy Barrett (Isobel Collins), John Karlen (Alfred Loomis), Jerry Lacy (Malachi Sands), Kathryn Leigh Scott (Patience Collins), Christopher Pennock (Uriah Spencer Stockbridge), Lisa Richards (Euphemia Spencer Stockbridge), Mitchell Ryan (Caleb Collins), David Selby (Theodore Collins), James Storm (Abraham Harkaway), and Marie Wallace (Dorothea Summers).

Audiobooks

Bloodlust Miniseries
In 2015, a miniseries, entitled “Bloodlust”, consisted of thirteen episodes released in twice-weekly downloadable instalments as to emulate the original soap opera format of the show.  A follow-up miniseries titled “Bloodline” is planned for release in 2017. This follow-up was later delayed until 2019.

The Tony & Cassandra Mysteries

Short Story Collections

Awards and nominations

References

Radio dramas
Audiobooks by title or series